Highway 697 is a highway in the Canadian province of Saskatchewan that connects Highway 26 in the RM of Meota No. 468 to Highway 3 in the RM of Parkdale No. 498. There are no communities along Highway 697.

Travel route 
Highway 697 begins in a northerly direction at the intersection with Highway 26.  To the west along Highway 26 is the town of Vawn, and to the east along highway 26 is the town of Meota.  The beginning terminus circumnavigates around the western shoreline of Jackfish Lake. At Km 11.3, Highway 697 turns west sharply. At Km 16.1, Highway 697 then returns to its northerly routing. At Km 19.3 the highway meets with the junction with Highway 674. Highway 674 only extends in a westerly direction providing access to the town of Edam. At Km 35.5, Highway 697 intersects with Highway 794. Travel west on Highway 794 provides access to the town of Mervin, travel east on Highway 794 provides joins Highway 4 south of the town of Glaslyn. At Km 45.4, Highway 697 ends at Highway 3. To the north west of the terminal junction is the town of Livelong, to the south east along Highway 3 is the town of Glaslyn.

Intersections

See also 
Roads in Saskatchewan
Transportation in Saskatchewan

References 

697